"Your Letter" is the fourth and final single from R&B group 112 from their 1998 album, Room 112.

Q and Slim share lead vocals.

Charts

Weekly charts

References

Songs about letters (message)
2000 singles
112 (band) songs
Bad Boy Records singles
Songs written by Diane Warren
Music videos directed by Marcus Raboy
1998 songs